Port Haney station is a commuter rail station served by the West Coast Express line which connects Vancouver and Mission in British Columbia, Canada. The station is located on the north side of the Canadian Pacific Railway (CPR) tracks in Maple Ridge, just off River Road and 223rd Street. The station opened in 1995, when the West Coast Express began operating. All services are operated by TransLink.

Services
Port Haney is served by five West Coast Express trains per day in each direction: five in the morning to Vancouver, and five in the evening to Mission.

References

Maple Ridge, British Columbia
Railway stations in Canada opened in 1995
West Coast Express stations